Ajara Nchout Njoya (born 12 January 1993) is a Cameroonian professional footballer who plays as a forward for Serie A club Inter Milan and the Cameroon women's national team.

Early life
Born in Njissé, Foumban, Nchout states that her family discouraged her from playing football, preferring that she instead focus on education.

Club career 
In January 2015 Nchout agreed to join Western New York Flash of the NWSL. She had previously played in the Russian Top Division for FC Energy Voronezh and WFC Rossiyanka.

She was waived by the Flash in October 2015. In December 2015 she announced that she had signed for Sundsvalls DFF of the Swedish Elitettan.

Nchout later signed with Vålerenga after appearing in 22 matches for Sandviken. She missed the final of the Norwegian cup with Sandviken as she was on international duty with Cameroon, a match they lost.

International career 
As a member of the Cameroonian national team, she played at the 2012 Summer Olympics. She was also part of the national team at the 2015 FIFA Women's World Cup and 2019 FIFA Women's World Cup.  She was capped for all four matches in the 2015 World Cup, and scored a goal against Japan, the team that ended up placing second in the tournament.  During the 2019 World Cup, she scored the team's only two goals in the team's only win of group play that led them to the round of 16. In August 2019, she was nominated for 2019 FIFA Puskas Award for her goal against New Zealand at the FIFA Women's World Cup.

Honours 
Vålerenga
Toppserien: 2020
Norwegian Women's Cup: 2020
Atlético Madrid
 Supercopa de Espana: 2020–21
Cameroon

 Women's Africa Cup of Nations: runner-up: 2014, 2016, third place: 2018

Individual

 Elitettan top scorer: 2016

 Toppserien top scorer: 2020

 African Women's Footballer of the Year finalist: 2019, 2022

References

External links 
 
 
 
 
 

1993 births
Living people
People from West Region (Cameroon)
Cameroonian women's footballers
Women's association football forwards
FC Energy Voronezh players
WFC Rossiyanka players
Western New York Flash players
SK Brann Kvinner players
Vålerenga Fotball Damer players
Atlético Madrid Femenino players
Inter Milan (women) players
Russian Women's Football Championship players
National Women's Soccer League players
Toppserien players
Cameroon women's international footballers
Olympic footballers of Cameroon
Footballers at the 2012 Summer Olympics
2015 FIFA Women's World Cup players
2019 FIFA Women's World Cup players
Cameroonian expatriate women's footballers
Cameroonian expatriate sportspeople in Russia
Expatriate women's footballers in Russia
Cameroonian expatriate sportspeople in the United States
Expatriate women's soccer players in the United States
Cameroonian expatriate sportspeople in Sweden
Expatriate women's footballers in Sweden
Cameroonian expatriate sportspeople in Norway
Expatriate women's footballers in Norway
Cameroonian expatriate sportspeople in Spain
Expatriate women's footballers in Spain
Sundsvalls DFF players
Elitettan players